In mathematics, the Dehn–Sommerville equations are a complete set of linear relations between the numbers of faces of different dimension of a simplicial polytope. For polytopes of dimension 4 and 5, they were found by Max Dehn in 1905.  Their general form was established by Duncan Sommerville in 1927. The Dehn–Sommerville equations can be restated as a symmetry condition for the [[h-vector|h-vector]] of the simplicial polytope and this has become the standard formulation in recent combinatorics literature. By duality, analogous equations hold for simple polytopes.

 Statement 

Let P be a d-dimensional simplicial polytope. For i = 0, 1, ..., d − 1, let fi denote the number of i-dimensional faces of P. The sequence

 

is called the 'f-vector of the polytope P. Additionally, set

 

Then for any k = −1, 0, ..., d − 2, the following Dehn–Sommerville equation' holds:

When k = −1, it expresses the fact that Euler characteristic of a (d − 1)-dimensional simplicial sphere is equal to 1 + (−1)d − 1.

Dehn–Sommerville equations with different k are not independent. There are several ways to choose a maximal independent subset consisting of  equations. If d is even then the equations with k = 0, 2, 4, ..., d − 2 are independent. Another independent set consists of the equations with k = −1, 1, 3, ..., d − 3. If d is odd then the equations with k = −1, 1, 3, ..., d − 2 form one independent set and the equations with k = −1, 0, 2, 4, ..., d − 3 form another.

 Equivalent formulations 

Sommerville found a different way to state these equations:

 

where 0 ≤ k ≤ (d−1). This can be further facilitated introducing the notion of h-vector of P. For k = 0, 1, ..., d, let

 

The sequence

 

is called the h-vector of P. The f-vector and the h-vector uniquely determine each other through the relation

 

Then the Dehn–Sommerville equations can be restated simply as

 

The equations with 0 ≤ k ≤ (d−1) are independent, and the others are manifestly equivalent to them.

Richard Stanley gave an interpretation of the components of the h-vector of a simplicial convex polytope P in terms of the projective toric variety X associated with (the dual of) P. Namely, they are the dimensions of the even intersection cohomology groups of X:

 

(the odd intersection cohomology groups of X are all zero). In this language, the last form of the Dehn–Sommerville equations, the symmetry of the h-vector, is a manifestation of the Poincaré duality in the intersection cohomology of X.

References

 Branko Grünbaum, Convex Polytopes. Second edition. Graduate Texts in Mathematics, Vol. 221, Springer, 2003 
 Richard P. Stanley, Combinatorics and Commutative Algebra. Second edition. Progress in Mathematics, 41. Birkhäuser Boston, Inc., Boston, MA, 1996. 
 D. M. Y. Sommerville (1927) The relations connecting the angle sums and volume of a polytope in space of n dimensions. Proceedings of the Royal Society Series A, 115:103–19, weblink from JSTOR.
 Günter M. Ziegler, Lectures on Polytopes''. Springer, 1998. 

Polyhedral combinatorics